Karl Mayländer (2 October 1872 - deported 23 October 1941) was an Austrian art collector and businessman who was deported in 1941 from Vienna to Łódź, in German-occupied Poland, by the Nazis and later murdered in the Shoah.

Mayländer was an art collector and critic who was a member of the board of the Volksheim Ottakring (later the Volkshochschule Ottakring), an adult education school which also hosted art exhibitions. Mayländer acquired the work of many young Austrian artists, including many drawings by Egon Schiele whom he knew personally.

Art by Schiele owned by Mayländer has been the subject of restitution claims by his descendant in New York, Eva Zirkl. In 2010, an Austrian commission set up by the Austrian Federal Ministry of Arts, Education, and Culture investigated the ownership history, or provenance, of five paintings by Egon Schiele: "Girl with Sunglasses", "Portrait of Olga Gallus", "Proletrairan Children", "Portrait of Heinrich Benesch", and 'Portrait of a boy" and recommended that the paintings be restituted to Mayländer's heirs. However the commission had no authority to force a private museum like th eLeopold Museum to follow its recommendations. In 2016, after negociations, the Leopold Museum in Vienna agreed to return two of the five watercolour paintings by Schiele to Zirkl.

See also 
List of claims for restitution for Nazi looted art

The Holocaust in Austria

References

External links 

1872 births
1940s deaths
Year of death uncertain
Austrian art collectors
Austrian art critics
Austrian businesspeople
Austrian Jews who died in the Holocaust
Jewish art collectors